Quantum walks are quantum analogues of classical random walks. In contrast to the classical random walk, where the walker occupies definite states and the randomness arises due to stochastic transitions between states, in quantum walks randomness arises through: (1) quantum superposition of states, (2) non-random, reversible unitary evolution and (3) collapse of the wave function due to state measurements.

As with classical random walks, quantum walks admit formulations in both discrete time and continuous time.

Motivation
Quantum walks are motivated by the widespread use of classical random walks in the design of randomized algorithms, and are part of several quantum algorithms. For some oracular problems, quantum walks provide an exponential speedup over any classical algorithm. Quantum walks also give polynomial speedups over classical algorithms for many practical problems, such as the element distinctness problem, the triangle finding problem, and evaluating NAND trees. The well-known Grover search algorithm can also be viewed as a quantum walk algorithm.

Relation to classical random walks
Quantum walks exhibit very different features from classical random walks. In particular, they do not converge to limiting distributions and due to the power of quantum interference they may spread significantly faster or slower than their classical equivalents.

Continuous time

Continuous-time quantum walks arise when one replaces the continuum spatial domain in the Schrödinger equation with a discrete set. That is, instead of having a quantum particle propagate in a continuum, one restricts the set of possible position states to the vertex set  of some graph  which can be either finite or countably infinite. Under particular conditions, continuous-time quantum walks can provide a model for universal quantum computation.

Relation to non-relativistic Schrödinger dynamics 
Consider the dynamics of a non-relativistic, spin-less free quantum particle with mass  propagating on an infinite one-dimensional spatial domain. The particle's motion is completely described by its wave function  which satisfies the one-dimensional, free particle Schrödinger equation

 

Now suppose that only the spatial part of the domain is discretized,   being replaced with   where  is the separation between the spatial sites the particle can occupy. The wave function becomes the map  and the second spatial partial derivative becomes the discrete laplacian

 

 

where is a characteristic frequency. Common choices of graphs that show up in the study of continuous time quantum walks are the d-dimensional lattices , cycle graphs , d-dimensional discrete tori , the d-dimensional hypercube and random graphs.

Discrete time

Discrete-time quantum walks on  

The evolution of a quantum walk in discrete time is specified by the product of two unitary operators: (1) a "coin flip" operator and (2) a conditional shift operator, which are applied repeatedly. The following example is instructive here. Imagine a particle with a spin-1/2-degree of freedom propagating on a linear array of discrete sites. The particle's state can then be described by a product state

 

consisting of an internal spin state

 

and a position state

 

The product  in this setting is the Kronecker (tensor) product. The conditional shift operator for the quantum walk on the line is given by

 

i.e. the particle jumps right if it has spin up and left if it has spin down. Explicitly, the conditional shift operator acts on product states according to

 

 

A popular choice for such a transformation is the Hadamard gate , which, with respect to the standard z-component spin basis, has matrix representation

 

When this choice is made for the coin flip operator, the operator itself is called the "Hadamard coin" and the resulting quantum walk is called the "Hadamard walk".

 

Measurement of the system's state at this point would reveal an up spin at position 1 or a down spin at position −1, both with probability 1/2. In order to observe non-classical motion, no measurement is performed on the state at this point (and therefore do not force a collapse of the wave function). This way, quantum correlations are preserved and different position states can interfere with one another. This gives a drastically different probability distribution than the classical random walk (Gaussian distribution) as seen in the figure to the right. A symmetric probability distribution arises if the initial state is chosen to be

Dirac equation 
Consider what happens when we discretize a massive Dirac operator over one spatial dimension. In the absence of a mass term, we have left-movers and right-movers. They can be characterized by an internal degree of freedom, "spin" or a "coin". When we turn on a mass term, this corresponds to a rotation in this internal "coin" space. A quantum walk corresponds to iterating the shift and coin operators repeatedly.

This is very much like Richard Feynman's model of an electron in 1 (one) spatial and 1 (one) time dimension. He summed up the zigzagging paths, with left-moving segments corresponding to one spin (or coin), and right-moving segments to the other. See Feynman checkerboard for more details.

The transition probability for a 1-dimensional quantum walk behaves like the Hermite functions which 
(1) asymptotically oscillate in the classically allowed region,
(2) is approximated by the Airy function around the wall of the potential, and
(3) exponentially decay in the classically hidden region.

Realization 
Atomic lattice is the leading quantum platform in terms of scalability. Coined and coinless discrete-time quantum-walk could be realized in the atomic lattice via a distance-selective spin-exchange interaction. Remarkably the platform preserves the coherence over couple of hundred sites and steps in 1, 2 or 3 dimensions in the spatial space. The long-range dipolar interaction allows designing periodic boundary conditions, facilitating the QW over topological surfaces.

See also 

 Path integral formulation

References

Further reading

External links
International Workshop on Mathematical and Physical Foundations of Discrete Time Quantum Walk
Quantum walk

Quantum algorithms